Chalcis is a wasp genus in the tribe Chalcidini.

Species 
According to waspweb.org, there are 19 species in the Afrotropics : 
 Chalcis amphilochus Walker, 1846 (Sierra Leone)
 Chalcis bicolor Bingham, 1902 (Zimbabwe)
 Chalcis capensis Cameron, 1905 (South Africa)
 Chalcis ferox Kieffer, 1905 (Madagascar)
 Chalcis flavitarsis Kieffer, 1905 (Madagascar)
 Chalcis fuscus Schmitz, 1946 (Democratic Republic of Congo)
 Chalcis melanogastra Cameron, 1907 (South Africa)
 Chalcis melanospila Cameron, 1907 (South Africa)
 Chalcis microlinea Walker, 1862 (South Africa)
 Chalcis natalensis Cameron, 1907 (South Africa)
 Chalcis polyctor Walker, 1841 (South Africa)
 Chalcis pymi Cameron, 1905 (South Africa)
 Chalcis resus Walker, 1850 (Sierra Leone)
 Chalcis rotundata Cameron, 1905 (South Africa)
 Chalcis saussurei Kieffer, 1905 (Madagascar)
 Chalcis spilopus Cameron, 1905 (South Africa)
 Chalcis transvaalensis Cameron, 1911 (South Africa)
 Chalcis vera Boucek, 1974 (Namibia, South Africa)
 Chalcis visellus Walker, 1846 (Sierra Leone)

References 

 Boucek, Z. 1974, On some Chalcididae and Pteromalidae (Hymenoptera), with descriptions of new genera and species from Africa and one species from Asia. Journal of the Entomological Society of Southern Africa 37(2): 327-330.
 Cameron, P. 1905, On the Hymenoptera of the Albany Museum. (Third paper) Record of the Albany Museum 1: 297-314.
 Cameron, P. 1907, Descriptions of species of parasitic Hymenoptera, chiefly in the collections of the South African Museum, Cape Town. (Second paper) Annals of the South African Museum 5: 203-225.
 Fabricius, J.C. 1787, Mantissa Insectorum sistens species nuper detectas 1:272 Copenhagen Gibson A.P. 1993. Superfamilies Mymarommatoidea and Chalcidoidea (pp. 570–655). In GOULET, H. & HUBER, J. (eds). Hymenoptera of the World: an identification guide to families. Research Branch, Agriculture Canada, Ottawa, Canada, 668 pp.
 Kieffer, J.J. 1905, Neue Eucharinae und Chalcidinae. Berliner Entomologische Zeitschrift 49:262
 Schmitz, G. 1946, Chalcididae de l'Afrique Central. Exploration du Parc National Albert, Mission G.F. de Witte Fas. 48:54 Congo Belge, Inst. Parcs. Nat. Albert, Mission G.F. de Witte.

External links 

Hymenoptera genera
Chalcidoidea